Hornelen is a mountain in Bremanger Municipality in Vestland county, Norway.  The mountain sits on the eastern end of the island of Bremangerlandet, along the Frøysjøen strait, in the Nordfjord region of Norway.  At , it is the highest sea cliff in Europe (see illustration left), and has for a long time been used as a landmark for naval navigation.  It is a 4-hour hike to the summit from Berleneset (across the small fjord from the village of Berle).

The rock in Hornelen consists of sandstone of Devonian age, and it constitutes an important part of the geology of Norway.

See also
List of mountains of Norway

References

Mountains of Vestland
Bremanger